Medal of Merit for Blood Donation is a civil state decoration of Luxembourg established in 1979.

History 
Three-grade medal was established by Grand Duke Jean with decree of 22 October 1979. The Medal is awarded to voluntary blood donors only, by Grand Duke of Luxembourg, at the request of Minister of Health, who is advised by of the Council of Order. The Council of Order originally consisted of five people. It was changed by decree of 4 February 1985 and presently the council consists of seven members, of which minimum six is required to make advice. Members of the council are appointed for a four-year term and can be appointed for next one. Current council was appointed 17 February 2016. Foreigners may also be awarded, if they donated blood to recognized Luxembourg organization.

The Medal has three grades:
 Vermeil Medal
 Silver Medal
 Bronze Medal

According to information of Luxembourg Red Cross, Bronze Medal is awarded for donating blood twenty times, Silver Medal for forty times and  Vermeil Medal for eighty times, but such requirements are not included in decree. From the establishment of the medal in 1979 to 11 June 2016 (the day on which more people were awarded) it was awarded: 17,629 Bronze Medals, 10,097 Silver Medals and 3,085 Vermeil Medals. New decorations are awarded every year. Approx. 400 people were awarded on 21 October 2017.

Insignia 
The badge of medal is a cross of Red Cross, enameled in red, crowned, with diamond-shape plaques. On plaque on obverse is coat of arms of Grand Duchess of Luxembourg, which are three combined coats of arms with lions. In upper left quarter is lion, coat of arm of Nassau, in lower left quarter is lion, coat of arm of Luxembourg and in right half is lion, coat of arm of Belgium. On plaque on reverse is profile of Grand Duchess Joséphine Charlotte, facing left, surrounded by an inscription S.A.R Joséphine Charlotte Grande-Duchesse de Luxembourg (H.R.H. Joséphine Charlotte Grand Duchess of Luxembourg). Plaques, edges of cross and crown are, according to grade, gilded, silver or bronze. The ribbon of the medal is white with red stripe in the middle and thin three-colour (blue-white-red) stripes at edges.

References

External links
 Page of Luxembourg RC

Civil awards and decorations of Luxembourg
Blood donation
Awards established in 1979
1979 awards